"I'm in Touch with Your World" is a song by the American rock band the Cars, from their debut album, The Cars. It was written by Ric Ocasek.

Background
"I'm in Touch with Your World" features many bizarre sound effects played by Greg Hawkes. Hawkes said, "That was always one of my favorite ones to play live." He continued, "Plus, I figured it'd be fun for people to watch visually." The line "everything is science fiction" was the result of Hawkes mishearing Ocasek's original lyric, "everything you say is fiction"; hence the spacey sound effect after the line. Ocasek changed it to accommodate this. (Liner notes for The Cars Deluxe Edition, Rhino, 1999)

Aside from being released on The Cars, the song appeared as the B-side to the band's debut single, "Just What I Needed".

Reception
"I'm in Touch with Your World" has received mixed reviews from critics. Rolling Stone critic Kit Rachlis said "'I'm in Touch with Your World' and 'Moving in Stereo' are the kind of songs that certify psychedelia's bad name." On Billboard'''s 1978 review of The Cars, they noted "I'm in Touch with Your World" as one of the "[b]est cuts" on the album, while Jaime Welton, author of 1001 Albums You Must Hear Before You Die'', said that the song "employs a variety of sound effects that would be at home in a Looney Tunes cartoon[.]" Pitchfork Media writer Ryan Schreiber said, "Songs like 'I'm in Touch with Your World' and 'Don't Cha Stop' are, to say the least, not some of the best songs rock music has produced."

Personnel 

 Ric Ocasek – lead vocals, rhythm guitar
 Elliot Easton – lead guitar, backing vocals
 Benjamin Orr – backing vocals, bass guitar
 David Robinson – drums, percussion, backing vocals
 Greg Hawkes – keyboards, percussion, backing vocals

References

1978 songs
The Cars songs
Songs written by Ric Ocasek
Song recordings produced by Roy Thomas Baker